Wayne D. Overholser (born September 4, 1906 in Pomeroy, Washington; † died August 27, 1996 in Boulder, Colorado), was an American Western writer. Overholser won the 1953 First Spur Award for Best Western Novel for Lawman using the pseudonym Lee Leighton. Lawman was made into the motion picture Star in the Dust, starring John Agar and Richard Boone (and Clint Eastwood in his first - uncredited - Western role), in 1956. In 1955 he won the 1954 (second) Spur Award for The Violent Land. He won the Spur Award for a third time in 1969 for his juvenile novel about the Meeker Massacre, with Lewis Patten. Three additional pseudonyms were John S. Daniels, Dan J. Stevens and Joseph Wayne; combinations of his three sons' names.

In popular culture
Overholser was also referenced in Stephen King's novel Wolves of the Calla, part of King's Dark Tower, in which he was both mentioned explicitly, as is the namesake of a character in the town of Calla Bryn Sturgis.

Work

 Buckaroo's Code (1947)
 West of the Rimrock (1949)
 Draw or Drag (1950)
 The Snake Stomper (1951) writing as Joseph Wayne
 Law Man (1953) writing as Lee Leighton
 Steel to the South (1953)
 Fabulous Gunman (1954)
 The Nester (1954) writing as John S. Daniels
 Beyond the Pass (1956) writing as Lee Leighton
 Cast a Long Shadow )1957)
 The Lone Deputy (1960)
 The Killer Marshal (1961)
 Standoff at the River (1961)
 War in Sandoval County (1961)
 The Bitter Night (1962)
 The Judas Gun (1962)
 The Trial of Billy Peale (1963)
 A Gun for Johnny Deere (1964)
 To the Far Mountains (1964)
 Day of Judgement (1965) aka Colorado Incident Big Ugly (1966) writing as Lee Leighton
 Ride Into Danger (1967)
 Summer of the Sioux (1967)
 Hanging at Pulpit Rock (1967) writing as Lee Leighton
 North to Deadwood (1968) published in German as Dakota Jones (1969)
 The Meeker Massacre (1969) with Lewis B Patten
 You'll never hang me (1971) writing as Lee Leighton
 The Noose (1972)
 The Long Trail North (1973)
 Brand 99 (1974)
 Diablo Ghost (1978)
 The Trouble Kid (1978)
 The Cattle Queen Feud (1979)
 Cassidy (1980) writing as Lee Leighton
 Sun on the Wall (1981)
 Mason County War (1981)
 Dangerous Patrol (1982)
 The Long Wind (1986)
 Bunch Grass (1986)
 Gunplay Valley: The Sweet And Bitter Land (1987)
 Return of the Kid (1987)
 By Gun and Spur (1987)
 Red Snow (1988)
 The Dry Gulcher (1988)
 Gunlock (1988)
 Red Is the Valley (1988)
 Land of Promises (1989)
 Proud Journey (1989)
 Valley of Guns (1991)
 Cast a Long Shadow (1991)
 Desperate Man (1992)
 The Violent Land (1992)
 Hearn's Valley (1992)
 Tough Hand (1992)
 The Hunted (1994)
 The Patriarch of Gunsight Flat (1996)
 They Hanged Wild Bill Murphy (1996)
 Nightmare in Broken Bow (1997)
 Nugget City (1997)
 War Party (1997) writing as John S. Daniels
 The Violent Men (1997)
 Riders of the Sundowns (1997)
 Buckskin Man (1998)
 The Petticoat Brigade (1998)
 Oregon Trunk (1998)
 Chumley's Gold (1999)
 Ride the Red Trail (2000)
 Tales of the West (2000)
 Gunflame (2000)
 The Outlaws (2000)
 Gateway House (2001)
 Revenge in Crow City (2001)
 Rainbow Rider (2001)
 The Day the Killers Came (2002)
 The Three Sons of Adam Jones (2003)
 The Bad Man (2003)
 Wild Horse River (2003)
 The Law at Miles City (2004)
 Bitter Wind (2006)
 Fight for the Valley (2007) writing as Lee Leighton
 Tomahawk (2009) writing as Lee Leighton
 Pass Creek Valley (2009)
 Shadow on the Land (2009)
 Law at Angel's Landing (2010)
 The Man from Yesterday (2010)
 Death of a Cattle King (2011)
 Ten Mile Valley (2012)
 The Waiting Gun (2013)
 Swampland Empire (2013)

Collections
 The Best Western Stories of Wayne D. Overholser (1984) aka The Best Western Stories

References 

1906 births
1996 deaths
Western (genre) writers
People from Pomeroy, Washington